Chlanidophora albicancellata is a moth in the family Noctuidae first described by Hermann Burmeister in 1878. It can be found in Argentina; it was historically misclassified, but in 2010 was determined to belong to the subfamily Agaristinae.

References

Agaristinae